Hillis Peak is a summit in the U.S. state of Oregon.

Hillis Peak was named in the 1860s after William P. Hillis, a pioneer settler.

References

Mountains of Jackson County, Oregon
Mountains of Oregon